Bridgeman Downs is a northern suburb in the City of Brisbane, Queensland, Australia.

Geography 
Bridgeman Downs has long been associated with large acreage properties.

History 
In November 1860 Henry St John Bridgeman bought land bounded by Albany Creek Road, Bridgeman Road and Beams Road.

The development of Bridgeman Down as a residential area occurred in the late 1980s and early 1990s.

The Anglican Church of the Resurrection was dedicated and consecrated in 1981.

The median age of the Bridgeman Downs population was 40 years of age, 3 years above the Australian median. 74.6% of people living in Bridgeman Downs were born in Australia, compared to the national average of 69.8%; the next most common countries of birth were England 4.5%, New Zealand 2.4%, India 1.9%, South Africa 1.7%, Fiji 1.2%. 84.1% of people spoke only English at home; the next most popular languages were 2.3% Italian, 1.4% Cantonese, 1.2% Hindi, 0.9% Mandarin, 0.7% Afrikaans.

Education 
There are no schools in Bridgeman Downs. The nearest government primary schools are Bald Hills State School in neighbouring Bald Hills to the north, Aspley State School and Aspley East State School both in neighbouring Aspley to the east, McDowall State School in neighbouring McDowall to the south, and Albany Creek State School in neighbouring Albany Creek to the west. The nearest government secondary schools are Aspley State High School in Aspley, Craigslea State High School in Chermside West to the south-east, and Albany Creek State High School in Albany Creek.

Amenities 

Shopping villages such as Mcdowall village and Metro on Beckett service the southern part of the suburb. As the Aspley Hypermarket services the top half. Major shopping centers that are close include Brookside Shopping Centre, Stafford City Shopping Centre, Aspley Hypermarket and Westfield Chermside.

Bridgeman Downs has a number of churches:
 Victory Church
 Bridgeman Baptist Community Church
 Bridgeman Downs Christian Outreach Centre
 C3 Church
 Anglican Church of the Resurrection at 30 Ridley Road.

The Pinnaroo Cemetery and Crematorium is located at Graham Street in Bridgeman Downs.

There are a number of parks in the suburb, including:
 Albany Creek Road Park (no.245)
 Albany Creek Road Reserve
 Althorp Road Park
 Bangalow Street Park (no.192)
 Beckett Road Park
 Camelot Place Park
 Canopus Street Park
 Chermside Hills Reserve
 Clarrie Beckingham Reserve
 Coolabah Crescent Park
 Darien Street Park (no.29)
 Fiddlewood Place Park
 Flametree Street Park
 Habitat Place Park
 Kensington Place Park
 Laguna Place Park
 Myrtle Crescent Park
 Parkview Place Park
 Pat Rafter Park
 Roghan Road Park (no.2105)
 Solar Park
 Tallowwood Place Park
 Travorten Drive Park
 Wattle Close Park
 Wendon Way Park

Transport 
Buses come at regular intervals, and run throughout the day, with Beckett Road being the main corridor.

References

Further reading

External links

 
 Bridgeman Baptist Community Church – Bridgeman Downs
 
 

Suburbs of the City of Brisbane